Bhorgiri Fort is a fort in Pune district near to Bhimashankar in the Indian state of Maharashtra.

Location
The fort is located about 95 km from Pune. The nearest town is Rajgurunagar (Khed). This fort is also about 45km west of the Rajgurunagar town on a small hill detached from the Bhimashankar Hill. The fort is situated near the village Bhorgiri. The fort hill is flanked on both sides by Bhima river and a small tributary of the Bhima river.

Places to see
There are many caves and shiva lingams on the fort. The structures on the fort are now shrub-covered ruins. There is a stone idol of the god Virabhadra on the fort.

History
Very little history of this fort is known. Similar to the Padargad fort in Karjat side of the ancient trade route linking Konkan with the Pune region, this fort was also used as a surveillance fort on the Pune side.

References 

Buildings and structures of the Maratha Empire
Forts in Pune district
16th-century forts in India
Caves of Maharashtra
Tourist attractions in Pune district